Sofía Luini (born 11 November 1992) is an Argentine tennis player.

Luini has won one singles title and ten doubles titles on the ITF Circuit. On 22 September 2014, she reached her best singles ranking of world No. 492. On 24 November 2014, she peaked at No. 308 in the doubles rankings.

Partnering Guadalupe Pérez Rojas, Luini won her first $50k tournament at the CIT Paraguay Open, defeating Anastasia Pivovarova and Patricia Maria Țig in the 2014 final.

ITF Circuit finals

Singles: 2 (1 title, 1 runner-up)

Doubles: 25 (10 titles, 15 runner-ups)

References

External links
 
 

1992 births
Living people
Tennis players from Buenos Aires
Argentine female tennis players
21st-century Argentine women